Montenegro competed at the 2020 Winter Youth Olympics in Lausanne, Switzerland from 9 to 22 January 2020.

Alpine skiing

Girls

Cross-country skiing

Boys

See also
Montenegro at the 2020 Summer Olympics

References 

Nations at the 2020 Winter Youth Olympics
Montenegro at the Youth Olympics